Oxford Harlequins (Oxford Quins) Rugby Football Club is a rugby union club based in Oxford, England.

In the 2021-22 season the men's 1st XV gained promotion to a new league in the England Rugby Club Championship, Regional 1 South Central, a new nomenclature for National 3 / level five of the English rugby union system. As of Sept 2022, the women's 1st XV compete in National Challenge 1 South East, level 4 of the England Rugby Women's Club Championship. The men's 2nd XV compete in Counties 2 Tribute Berks/Bucks & Oxon North, level 8 of the RFU rugby pyramid. The men's 3rd XV compete in Counties 3 Tribute Berks Bucks & Oxon North, level 9 of the RFU Rugby pyramid. The women's 2nd XV compete in National Challenge 2, level 5 of the England Rugby women's club championship.

Stu Wells was appointed Director of Rugby in July 2019.

Pete Davies was appointed as Men's Head Coach in August 2019. Davies began his career at Henley Hawks RFC fresh out of university after moving to England from his native nation of Wales. Combined with a brief stint with Newbury in the Championship, Davies spent a total of 10 years playing for the Hawks, making an immediate transition from player to attack/assistant coach in 2010. Having spent four years as Head Coach at Henley (winning 2 promotions to National League 1 in 8 years), Davies played a significant hand in the evolution of a number of international stars and a myriad of Premiership regulars including Piers O'Conor (Bristol Bears), Alec Hepburn (Exeter Chiefs), Will Rowlands (Wasps RFC & Dragons RFC), Theo Brophy-Clews (London Irish), Jack Willis (rugby union) (Wasps RFC & England national rugby union team) and Jonah Holmes (London Welsh RFC, Wasps RFC & Wales national rugby union team) .

The Women's Head Coach for the 2022-23 season is Pat Metcalfe-Jones (more info on Metcalfe-Jones below).

Men's Rugby

Following the appointment of Stu Wells and Pete Davies in 2019 the men's 1st XV achieved its highest league finish since the 2015-16 season before the season was curtailed by the national lockdowns of March 2020.

The 2020-21 season was cancelled due to the Covid Pandemic and subsequent lockdowns.

The 2022-23 season was a record-breaking season for Oxford Quins men's 1st XV, in which the team, under co-captains Allan Purchase & Nick Marshall, won 25 out of 26 league matches, scored 1046 points, amassed 20 try bonus points, and despite starting their campaign with a -5 points deduction, still managed to win the league and, as league champions, were awarded promotion to Tier 5 of the England Rugby Club Championship.

By Sept 2022 Oxford Quins men's section had sufficient playing numbers to relaunch a Men's 3rd XV in Berkshire Buckinghamshire Oxfordshire (BBO) 3 North, tier 10 of the RFU Club Championship. Led by their Captain, Henry Folds, and former Oxford Quins Director of Rugby Alan Hancock, the Oxford Quins 3s finished their first season in 6 years as League Champions and won promotion to the new Counties 3 Tribute BBO North, tier 9 of the RFU Club Championship.

Partnership with Oxford Brookes University, The Brookes Quins Partnership

Ahead of the 2019–20 season Oxford Brookes RFC moved operations from Oxford R.F.C. over to Horspath Sports Ground.

In July 2020 the Directors of Rugby at Oxford Quins and Oxford Brookes, Stu Wells and Joe Winpenny, collaborated to create a partnership between the two institutions, subsequently, Oxford Quins and Oxford Brookes University formed the Brookes Quins Partnership. The partnership provides an elite performance pathway for talented Oxford Brookes players whilst creating a sustainable talent pool of players excited by the opportunity to play for Oxford Quins. At the same time, it facilitates workforce opportunities for students - providing them with experience relevant to their academic work and future career aspirations. In addition, players and coaches look to embrace social and civic duties in improving physical and mental wellness among members of the local community.

In August 2022 former Premiership player, Tom Varndell, was appointed as Head of Community at Oxford Quins and Head of Men's Rugby at Oxford Brookes University in a new combined role under the Brookes Quins Partnership umbrella. Varndell made 180 appearances in the Premiership including 82 for Leicester Tigers, 88 for Wasps and most recently 10 appearances for Bristol Bears. He held the record for Premiership tries scored, 92 tries until May 2022. Tom also has 4 England caps, represented England 7s, and won a Commonwealth 7s Gold medal. At 6 foot 4” and weighing over 200lbs Tom was one of the most prolific try scorers the Premiership has ever seen. Varndell also registered with Oxford Quins men's 1st XV as an amateur player.

Women's Rugby

In September 2020, Oxford Quins launched a Women's Section with the appointment of Pat Metcalfe-Jones as Women's Head Coach. At the time of her appointment, Metcalfe-Jones was the head coach & a player at Oxford University Women's RFC having previously been the Head Coach at Oxford Brookes University. She had combined her role as player/coach at Oxford University with playing Premiership Rugby for Richmond in the RFU Tyrell's Premier 15s (as of 2022 known as the Allianz Premier 15s). Upon her appointment to the Brookes Quins Partnership Metcalfe-Jones took on a newly created dual role as Head of Women's Rugby at both Oxford Quins and Oxford Brookes, the former Harlequins & Richmond Premiership player leading the new combined women's program under the Brookes Quins umbrella.

The newly formed Women's 1st XV at Oxford Quins was entered into Level 4 of the RFU Women's Championship, National Challenge 1, for the 2021-22 season. In September 2021 former England International Charlotte "Beanie" Barras was appointed as Women's Assistant Coach at Oxford Quins, working under Metcalfe-Jones. Barras scored the only try for England in the 2010 Rugby World Cup Final against New Zealand. In their first season, Oxford Quins Women's 1st XV finished 5th in NC1 South East  finishing the season with a 51-37 win over Drybrook, a team that they had lost to 39-0 in their first league match of the season and squad numbers had grown sufficiently to enable the creation of a Women's 2nd XV for the 2022-23 season: the new 2nd XV were entered into tier 5 of the RFU Women's Championship, National Challenge 2.

The Lord Mayor of Oxford's Festival of Rugby
In May 2021, following discussions between Oxford Quins Director of Rugby, Stu Wells, and the Lord Mayor of Oxford, Mark Lygo, the club launched the inaugural Lord Mayor's Festival of Rugby in collaboration with Oxford City Council. The festival raised money for the Lord Mayor's charities and introduced a new prestigious event to the Oxford rugby calendar that saw teams compete for the Lord Mayor's Men's Cup, Plate and Bowl, Women's Cup & Under 18 Boys' Cup. Following the success of the inaugural festival, it was agreed that Lord Mayor's Festival would become an annual event.

Oxford 7s
In April 2022 Oxford Quins relaunched the Oxford 7s, following discussions between Oxford Quins Director of Rugby, Stu Wells, and the head of Apache 7s, Adam Hurst. The Oxford 7s inaugural competition featured an elite men's competition with teams from Jamaica 7s, WildDogs 7s, Apache 7s, Oxford Quins 7s, CRX Malborough, Oxford Brookes & Oxford Barbarians and was won by CRX Malborough. An inaugural women's competition featured teams from Oxford University 7s, Oxford Quins 7s, Oxford Brookes 7s & Chinnor Kites and was won by Oxford Brookes 7s. The men's open featured teams from across the region and was won by the Stiff Richards. The Oxford 7s will return for 2023 with Oxford Quins Community Coach & former Premiership Player, Tom Varndell, overseeing the event.

Club History
Oxford Harlequins RFC was formed in 1996 following the merger of Oxford Marathons RFC and Oxford Old Boys RFC. Oxford Quins are now the leading club in the City of Oxford taking over from Oxford R.F.C. whose 1st XV as of 2022 play in tier 8 of the RFU rugby pyramid in the Counties 2 Berks Bucks Oxon North, the same league as Oxford Quins Men's 2nd XV.

In 2015 a possible merger between Oxford RFC and Oxford Harlequins failed to materialise and Oxford Quins moved their matches to Marston Ferry Road.

In 2018 Oxford Harlequins moved from Marston Ferry Road to Horspath Sports Ground following the grant of a 30-year lease on the ground from Oxford City Council and the decision by the RFU to invest over £750,000 to build a new floodlit artificial turf rugby pitch at the new site.

In July 2021 Oxford Harlequins adopted a new brand and logo, dropping the "Harlequins" in favour of "Quins" and replacing the logo with a more modern design.

U18 Boys Academy and Youth Section 

The club runs an Under 16 to Under 18 Academy: In 2019-20 former Tonga International Keni Fisilau, who also amassed over 200 caps in the English Rugby Championship, was appointed as Head Coach of the Oxford Quins Academy.

Oxford Quins runs a large Mini and Junior Youth section for boys and girls aged 5 to 18, as of 2018 the youth section was one of the largest in Oxfordshire with over 450 players.

Under 18 Bullingdon Cup
In Sept 2021, following discussions between Oxford Quins Director of Rugby Stu Wells and the Head of Rugby at St Edward's School, Oxford, Rob Cottrell, the U18 Bullingdon Cup competition was created between Oxford Quins Under 18 Boy's Academy 1st XV and St Edwards's (Teddies) 1st XV, the two teams competing annually for the Bullingdon Cup. The remnants of Bullingdon Green form part of Oxford Quins ground at Horspath Recreation ground  and was the site of one of the oldest rugby fixtures in Oxford, 9 years after St Edward's Oxford was founded, in which Oxford Military College played an annual fixture against St Edward's 1st XV between 1874 & 1876 on Bullingdon Green.

Honours (Oxford Harlequins)
Men's 1st team:
 Southern Counties North Champions: 2001–02
 South West Division 1 East Champions (3): 2002–03, 2013–14, 2021–22
 Oxfordshire RFU County Cup Winners (6): 2004, 2006, 2007, 2008, 2009, 2014

Men's 2nd team:
 Berks/Bucks & Oxon Premier A Champions: 2006–07

Men's 3rd team:
 Berks/Bucks & Oxon 3 Champions: 2021-22

Men's 4th team:
 Berks/Bucks & Oxon 2 South Champions: 2004–05

Honours (founder clubs)

Oxford Marathon
 Bucks/Oxon 1 champions: 1992–93

Oxford Old Boys
 Oxfordshire RFU County Cup winners (3): 1972, 1974, 1984
 Bucks/Oxon 1 champions: 1995–96
 Middlesex Sevens finalists: 1982

Notes

References

External links
 https://oxfordharlequins.rfu.club/

English rugby union teams
Rugby clubs established in 1996
1996 establishments in England
Sport in Oxford
Rugby union in Oxfordshire